Botrychium is a genus of ferns, seedless vascular plants in the family Ophioglossaceae. Botrychium species are known as moonworts. They are small, with fleshy roots, and reproduce by spores shed into the air. One part of the leaf, the trophophore, is sterile and fernlike; the other, the sporophore, is fertile and carries the clusters of sporangia or spore cases.  Some species only occasionally emerge above ground and gain most of their nourishment from an association with mycorrhizal fungi.

The circumscription of Botrychium is disputed between different authors; some botanists include the genera Botrypus and Sceptridium within Botrychium, while others treat them as distinct. The latter treatment is provisionally followed here.

Taxonomy

  – pointed moonwort
  – Alaska moonwort
  – upswept moonwort, triangle-lobed moonwort, upward-lobed moonwort
  – northern moonwort
  – prairie moonwort, prairie dunewort, Iowa moonwort
  – dainty moonwort, crenulate moonwort
  – thin-leaved moonwort
 Botrychium dusenii (Christ 1906) Alston 1960
  – reflected grapfern
 Botrychium furculatum Popovich & Farrar 2020
  – Frenchman's Bluff moonwort
  – western moonwort
  – triangle moonwort, triangle grapefern, lance-leaved grapefern
 Botrychium lineare  – skinny moonwort, narrowleaf grapefern
 Botrychium lunaria  – common moonwort, grapefern moonwort
 Botrychium matricariifolium  – daisy-leaved moonwort, matricary grapefern, matricary moonwort, chamomile grapefern
 Botrychium michiganense Wagner ex Gilman, Farrar & Zika 2015 (Michigan moonwort)
 Botrychium minganense  – Mingan's moonwort
 Botrychium montanum  – western goblin, mountain moonwort
 Botrychium mormo  – little goblin moonwort
 Botrychium neolunaria  – common moonwort
 Botrychium pallidum  – Pale moonwort
 Botrychium paradoxum  – paradox moonwort, peculiar moonwort
 Botrychium pedunculosum  – stalked moonwort
 Botrychium pinnatum  – northern moonwort
 Botrychium pseudopinnatum  – false northwestern moonwort, false daisy-leaved grapefern
 Botrychium pumicola  – pumice moonwort, pumice grape-fern
 Botrychium simplex  – least moonwort, little grapefern, least grapefern
 Botrychium socorrense  – Isla Socorro moonwort
 Botrychium spathulatum  – spatulate moonwort, spoon-leaved moonwort
 Botrychium sutchuanense Chien & Chun 1959
 Botrychium tolucaense Wagner & Mickel 2004
 Botrychium tunux  – moosewort
 Botrychium × watertonense  – Waterton grapefern
 Botrychium yaaxudakeit  – giant moonwort, Yakutat moonwort

Conservation

Moonworts can be found in many environments, including prairies, forests, and mountains.  While some Botrychium species are quite rare, conservation efforts can be difficult.  Determining the rarity of a species is complicated by the plants’ small leaves, which stand only 2-10 centimeters above the soil.  Even more of a challenge in obtaining an accurate population count is the genus’s largely subterranean life cycle.  The vast majority of any one population of moonworts actually exists below ground in banks consisting of several types of propagules.  One type of propagule is the ungerminated spores, which must percolate through the soil beyond the reach of light in order to germinate.  This presumably increases the probability that the spore will be in range of a mycorrhizal symbiont before it produces the tiny, roughly heart-shaped gametophyte, which also exists entirely below ground.  Finally, some species produce gemmae, a form of asexual propagation achieved by budding of the root.

Juvenile and dormant sporophytes can also be hidden in the soil for long periods of time.  Mature sporophytes do not necessarily produce a leaf annually; they can remain viable underground for up to 10 years without putting up a photosynthetic component.  This feat is made possible by their dependence on symbiotic partnership with AM fungi of the genus Glomus, which supply most fixed carbon for growth and reproduction.

This mycorrhizal dependence has also made lab cultivation of moonworts difficult.  Thus far, only germination of the gametophyte has been successful.

References

External links
  USDA Plants Profile for Botrychium (grapefern)
 Efloras.org: Flora of North America, treatment of genus Botrychium
 ITIS.gov: List of Botrychium species — with species links.

 
Fern genera
Ferns of the Americas
Ferns of the United States
Taxa named by Olof Swartz